Wilkur is a locality in the Mount Jeffcot ward of the local government area of the Shire of Buloke and the Warracknabeal ward of the Shire of Yarriambiack, Victoria, Australia. Wilkur post office there opened in 1905, closed on 30 September 1912 reopened on 1 February 1926 and later closed on 27 May 1950. Wilkur South post office opened on 28 June 1920 and was closed on 31 July 1957. Cameron's post office opened on 1 October 1904 renamed Beyal in April 1911 and was closed on 31 August 1929.

References